is a Japanese photographer.

Notes

External links
 Kazuyoshi Nomachi photography website

Japanese photographers
1946 births
Living people
Recipients of the Medal with Purple Ribbon
Date of birth missing (living people)
20th-century Japanese photographers